The Conway River is part of the traditional boundary between the Canterbury and Marlborough regions in the South Island of New Zealand.

The Charwell River is a tributary. It was probably named after the River Conwy in North Wales, as this was the origin of Thomas Hanmer, an owner of Hawkeswood Station near this river during the 1850s.

References

Rivers of Canterbury, New Zealand
Hurunui District
Kaikōura District
Rivers of New Zealand